This is a list of fellows and foreign members of the Royal Society elected in 1983.

Fellows

Ian Graham Gass
William Wilton Douglas
Charles David Marsden
Dennis W. Sciama
Ian Sneddon
Sivaramakrishna Chandrasekhar
Ted Paige
Anthony Trafford James
Christopher Polge
Sir Philip Randle
John Lawson  (d. 2008)
Alan Sargeson
Felix Weinberg  (d. 2012)
Margaret Thatcher (under Statute 12)
George William Gray  (1926–2013)
Martin Aitken
Sir David Attenborough (under Statute 12)
Sir Patrick Bateson
Edward Cocking
Pierre Deslongchamps
Reginald John Ellis
Malcolm Ferguson-Smith
Sir Alan Fersht
William Alexander Gambling
Ian Read Gibbons
Ray Guillery
Richard Henderson
Peter Higgs
Christopher Hooley
Peter Lawrence
George Lusztig
Donald Metcalf
Sir Keith O'Nions
Sir Michael Pepper
Michael J. D. Powell
Ivan Roitt
Sir Edwin Southern
Brian Spalding
Nigel Unwin
Ian Macmillan Ward
John Westcott
Dudley Howard Williams

Foreign members

George Evelyn Hutchinson
Jean Leray
Henry Stommel
Charles Weissmann
Frank Westheimer

References

1983
1983 in science
1983 in the United Kingdom